Brad McKenzie (born 29 May 1993) is a former professional Australian rules footballer who played for the North Melbourne Football Club in the Australian Football League (AFL).

He was drafted with the eighteenth selection in the 2011 AFL draft from Sturt in the South Australian National Football League. He represented South Australia at the 2011 AFL Under 18 Championships and made his league debut for Sturt late in 2011. At the conclusion of the 2016 season, he was delisted by North Melbourne. He now plays for the Norwood Football Club in the SANFL.

Statistics

|- style="background-color: #EAEAEA"
! scope="row" style="text-align:center" | 2012
|style="text-align:center;"|
| 2 || 2 || 0 || 0 || 3 || 3 || 6 || 4 || 0 || 0.0 || 0.0 || 1.5 || 1.5 || 3.0 || 2.0 || 0.0
|-
! scope="row" style="text-align:center" | 2013
|style="text-align:center;"|
| 2 || 10 || 1 || 3 || 67 || 49 || 116 || 33 || 15 || 0.1 || 0.3 || 6.7 || 4.9 || 11.6 || 3.3 || 1.5
|- style="background-color: #EAEAEA"
! scope="row" style="text-align:center" | 2014
|style="text-align:center;"|
| 2 || 10 || 3 || 0 || 81 || 53 || 134 || 36 || 17 || 0.3 || 0.0 || 8.1 || 5.3 || 13.4 || 3.6 || 1.7
|-
! scope="row" style="text-align:center" | 2015
|style="text-align:center;"|
| 2 || 1 || 1 || 1 || 10 || 8 || 18 || 3 || 2 || 1.0 || 1.0 || 10.0 || 8.0 || 18.0 || 3.0 || 2.0
|- style="background-color: #EAEAEA"
! scope="row" style="text-align:center" | 2016
|style="text-align:center;"|
| 2 || 14 || 1 || 1 || 152 || 60 || 212 || 52 || 33 || 0.1 || 0.1 || 10.9 || 4.3 || 15.1 || 3.7 || 2.4
|- class="sortbottom"
! colspan=3| Career
! 37
! 6
! 5
! 313
! 173
! 486
! 128
! 67
! 0.2
! 0.1
! 8.5
! 4.7
! 13.1
! 3.5
! 1.8
|}

References

External links

Living people
1993 births
Australian rules footballers from South Australia
Sturt Football Club players
North Melbourne Football Club players
Place of birth missing (living people)
Werribee Football Club players
North Ballarat Football Club players
Norwood Football Club players